Sarah Eagle Heart is an acclaimed Indigenous storyteller, Emmy Award-winning producer, writer, and activist. She also serves as the CEO of Return to the Heart Foundation. Through her work, Sarah serves as an advocate and educator for the needs and perspectives of Indigenous groups throughout the United States.

Early life and education 
Sarah Eagle Heart is a member of the Oglala Sioux Nation. She is from the Pine Ridge Reservation in South Dakota.

Sarah attended Black Hills State University where she receives a Bachelor of Arts in Mass Communications with a multimedia and print emphasis and Bachelor of Science in American Indian Studies. She received her Master of Business Administration (global management emphasis) from University of Phoenix.

Career 
She seeks to share Indigenous stories and bring them to mainstream media. Sarah is a founding member of the National Native American Boarding School Healing Coalition, This organization seeks to create a deeper understanding of the impact of the U.S. Indian Boarding School policy and generational trauma. She previously served as the CEO of Native Americans in Philanthropy. This organization seeks to promote philanthropic efforts of Indigenous groups and activists.

Throughout her career, Eagle Heart has worked on several notable projects. She served as a co-producer of the animated short Crow: The Legend. This VR interactive short movie presents the story of a Native American folktale. She received an Emmy for her role as a consulting producer.

She also served as a producer for the documentary Lakota Nation vs. the United States. This film outlines the conflict between Indigenous peoples and European settlers. It includes the perspectives of many Indigenous activists.  

Along with her work in the film industry, Eagle Heart has also worked to tell Native stories through writing. She wrote a memoir titled Warrior Princesses Strike Back: How Lakota Twins Fight Oppression and Heal through Connectedness with her sister Emma Eagle Heart-White. The book outlines their life as Lakota twin sisters through their upbringing on the Pine Ridge Reservation. The work also presents self-help methods for women of color, discussions of intergenerational and personal trauma, and insight into “decolonial therapy.”

Awards 
Eagle Hart was awarded an Emmy in Outstanding Interactive Media in 2019 for her role as a co-producer for the film. She was the Winner of the American Express NGen Leadership Award  in 2017. She was also the Winner of the National Center for American Indian Enterprise Development’s Top 40 under 40 in 2014.

Personal life 
Her partner is Kevin Killer, the 44th President of the Oglala Sioux Tribe.

References 

Wikipedia Student Program
Native American filmmakers
Native American women writers
American women film producers
American film producers
Living people
Native American-related controversies in film
21st-century Native American women
21st-century Native Americans
Activists
Native American activists
Oglala people
Year of birth missing (living people)
Native American women
21st-century American women writers
Writers from South Dakota